Anania delicatalis is a moth in the family Crambidae. It was described by South in 1901. It is found in China and Japan.

References

Moths described in 1901
Pyraustinae
Moths of Asia
Moths of Japan